Bobasatraniiformes is an extinct order of durophagous ray-finned fish that existed from the late Permian to the Middle Triassic in both marine and freshwater environments. The order includes two families: Bobasatraniidae, with the genera Bobasatrania, Ebenaqua, and Ecrinesomus, and Dorypteridae, comprising only the genus Dorypterus (monotypy). Bobasatraniiformes had a somewhat global distribution; fossils are found in Africa (Madagascar), Asia (Pakistan), Australia, Europe, and North America.

Bobasatraniiformes have a deepend body, a heterocercal caudal fin, and they often lack pelvic fins (present in Dorypterus, very small in Ebenaqua). Their dorsal and anal fins are often elongate (very elongate dorsal fin in Dorypterus). The body is covered in rhombic scales (scale cover reduced in Dorypterus). Their jaw bones lack teeth. Instead, they possessed strong tooth plates used to crush shelled prey animals similar to Modern osteoglossomorphs (Teleostei). 

The evolutionary relationships of Bobasatraniiformes with other actinopterygians is not well known, but they are usually placed outside of Neopterygii.

Bobasatraniiformes are one of the groups that survived the Permian-Triassic extinction event.

Systematics
 Order †Bobasatraniiformes Berg, 1940
 Family †Bobasatraniidae Stensiö, 1932
 Genus †Bobasatrania White, 1932 [†Haywardia Tanner, 1936; †Lambeichthys Lehman, 1956]
 †Bobasatrania antiqua (Accordi, 1955) [†Paralepidotus antiquus Accordi, 1955; †Paralepidotus moroderi Accordi, 1955]
 †Bobasatrania canadensis (Lambe, 1914) [†Platysomus canadensis Lambe, 1914; †Platysomus brewsteri Warren, 1936; †Haywardia jordani Tanner, 1936; †Lambeichthys canadensis Lehman, 1956]
 †Bobasatrania ceresiensis Bürgin, 1992
 †Bobasatrania groenlandica Stensiö, 1932 
 †Bobasatrania ladina (Accordi, 1955) [†Paralepidotus ladinus Accordi, 1955]
 †Bobasatrania mahavavica White, 1932 (type species)
 †Bobasatrania nathorsti (Stensiö, 1921) [†Platysomus nathorsti Stensiö, 1921]
 †Bobasatrania scutata (Gervais, 1852) [†Colobodus scutatus Gervais, 1852]
 Genus †Ebenaqua Campbell & Phuoc, 1983
 †Ebenaqua ritchiei Campbell & Phuoc, 1983 (type species)
 Genus †Ecrinesomus Woodward, 1910
 †Ecrinesomus dixoni Woodward, 1910 (type species)
 Family †Dorypteridae Cope, 1877
 Genus †Dorypterus Germar, 1842
 †Dorypterus hoffmanni Germar, 1842 (type species)
 †Dorypterus althausi (Münster, 1842)

Timeline of genera

References

Additional sources
 

Prehistoric fish orders
Prehistoric bony fish
Permian bony fish
Triassic bony fish
Lopingian first appearances
Middle Triassic extinctions